The term love apple may refer to:

The tomato (Solanum lycopersicum)
The wax apple (Syzygium samarangense)